Neoflavan is a heterocyclic chemical compound that forms the central core of neoflavonoids.

References

Neoflavonoids